Johnny Coghlan (24 April 1876 – 21 October 1916) was a former Australian rules footballer who played with Melbourne in the Victorian Football League (VFL).

Notes

External links 

Australian rules footballers from Victoria (Australia)
Melbourne Football Club players
Warragul Football Club players
1876 births
1916 deaths